Malekabad (also Romanized as Malekābād; also known as Malekābād-e Bālā, Malekābād-e ‘Olyā, Malikābād, and Melkābād-e ‘Olyā) is a village in Qasemabad Rural District, in the Central District of Rafsanjan County, Kerman Province, Iran. At the 2006 census, its population was 663, in 167 families.

References 

Populated places in Rafsanjan County